Letters from Marusia is a 1975 Mexican film directed by Chilean filmmaker Miguel Littín. It was nominated for the Academy Award for Best Foreign Language Film. It was also entered into the 1976 Cannes Film Festival. The film is based on a Patricio Manns novel (1974) inspired by the Marusia massacre of 1925.

Cast
 Gian Maria Volonté - Gregorio
 Diana Bracho - Luisa
 Claudio Obregón - Capt. Troncoso
 Eduardo López Rojas - Domingo Soto
 Patricia Reyes Spíndola - Rosa
 Salvador Sánchez - Sebastian
 Ernesto Gómez Cruz - Crisculo 'Medio Juan'
 Arturo Beristáin - Arturo
 Silvia Mariscal - Margarita
 Alejandro Parodi - Espinoza
 Patricio Castillo - Tte. Gaínza

See also
 List of submissions to the 48th Academy Awards for Best Foreign Language Film
 List of Mexican submissions for the Academy Award for Best Foreign Language Film

References

External links

1976 films
1976 drama films
Films scored by Mikis Theodorakis
Films about the labor movement
Films directed by Miguel Littín
Films set in 1907
Films set in Chile
Mexican historical drama films
Films about mining
1970s Spanish-language films
1970s Mexican films